Julian Conze (born 9 September 1999) is a German footballer who plays as a midfielder for UMBC Retrievers in the United States, the college team of the University of Maryland Baltimore County.

Club career
After five years in the jersey of Preußen Münster, he moved to the United States to study, where he receives a sports scholarship from the University of Maryland, Baltimore County. In addition to his studies, Conze would be playing for the college soccer team.

References

External links
 Profile at FuPa.net
 

1999 births
Living people
Sportspeople from Münster
Footballers from North Rhine-Westphalia
German footballers
Association football midfielders
SC Preußen Münster players
UMBC Retrievers men's soccer players
3. Liga players